Ayenia compacta is a species of shrub in the mallow family known by the common name California ayenia.

It is native to California, Arizona, and Baja California, in the Sonoran Desert and its Colorado Desert, and in the sky islands of the Mojave Desert.

Description
Ayenia compacta is a small shrub producing many erect, branching stems up to 40 centimeters tall from a taproot. The sparse leaves are oval in shape and edged in dull teeth.

The flowers appear in the leaf axils. Each has upcurled sepals in one layer and downcurled petals in a layer just above. Each petal has a threadlike claw.

The capsule fruit is a purple-tinted yellow sphere about half a centimeter wide.

External links
Jepson Manual Treatment of Ayenia compacta
USDA Plants Profile for Ayenia compacta
Ayenia compacta — UC Photos gallery

Byttnerioideae
Flora of the California desert regions
Flora of Baja California
Flora of Arizona
Flora of the Sonoran Deserts
Natural history of the Colorado Desert
Natural history of the Mojave Desert
Flora without expected TNC conservation status